Elizabeth McCracken (born 1966) is an American author. She is a recipient of the PEN New England Award.

Life and career
McCracken, a graduate of the Iowa Writers' Workshop, was born in Boston, Massachusetts, graduated from Newton North High School in Newton, Massachusetts, earned a B.A. and M.A. in English from Boston University, an M.F.A. from the University of Iowa, and an M.S. in Library Science from Drexel University. In 2008 and 2009, McCracken lived in Cambridge, MA, where she was a fellow at the Radcliffe Institute for Advanced Study.

McCracken is the daughter of the late Samuel McCracken, a professor at Boston University and an assistant to long-time BU president John Silber; and Natalie Jacobson McCracken, a retired editor-in-chief for development and alumni publications at BU. She is married to the novelist Edward Carey. They have a son, August George Carey Harvey, and a daughter, Matilda Libby Mary Harvey; an earlier child died before birth, an experience that formed the basis of McCracken's memoir An Exact Replica of a Figment of My Imagination.

McCracken holds the James Michener Chair of Fiction of the Michener Center for Writers at the University of Texas at Austin. She and her husband were previously on the faculty of the Iowa Writers' Workshop. She is the sister of former PC World magazine editor-in-chief and founder of Technologizer.com Harry McCracken.

Ann Patchett, in an interview for Blackbird at Virginia Commonwealth University, mentions that Elizabeth McCracken is her editor, and is the only person to read her manuscripts as she is writing them.

In 2014, she published her first collection of stories in 20 years: Thunderstruck & Other Stories. Among the nine stories is a tale about a successful documentary filmmaker who has to face a famous subject he manipulated and betrayed; one about a young scholar who is mourning his wife; and another about a grocery store manager who obsesses about a woman's disappearance. Sept 2014 in New York Times.  Her short story, "Hungry", was long-listed for the 2015 Sunday Times EFG Private Bank Short Story Award, the largest prize in the world for a single short story. On March 4, 2015, McCracken was named the winner of The Story Prize for Thunderstruck & Other Stories and received the top prize of $20,000.

Awards and honors
1996 National Book Awards finalist, The Giant’s House.
2002 L.L. Winship/PEN New England Award, Niagara Falls All Over Again.
2014 National Book Awards long list, Thunderstruck & Other Stories.
2015 The Story Prize for Thunderstruck & Other Stories.
2015 Sunday Times EFG Private Bank Short Story Award shortlist for 'Hungry'
2021 Sunday Times Short Story Award shortlist for The Irish Wedding

Bibliography
Here's Your Hat What's Your Hurry (1993, Random House) – the American Library Association listed this anthology on their "Notable Books for 1994" list
The Giant's House (1996, Vintage/Avon) – Granta Books included the excerptThe Giant of Cape Cod from The Giant's House in their collection Granta 54: Best of Young American Novelists
Niagara Falls All Over Again (2001)
An Exact Replica of a Figment of My Imagination (2008)
Thunderstruck (2014)
Bowlaway (2018)
The Souvenir Museum (2021)
The Hero of This Book (2022)

References

External links

1966 births
Living people
Writers from Boston
20th-century American novelists
21st-century American novelists
American women short story writers
American women novelists
Iowa Writers' Workshop alumni
Iowa Writers' Workshop faculty
Drexel University alumni
20th-century American women writers
21st-century American women writers
University of Texas faculty
20th-century American short story writers
21st-century American short story writers
Novelists from Texas
Novelists from Massachusetts
Novelists from Iowa
Newton North High School alumni
American women academics
O. Henry Award winners